Pytho is a genus of dead log beetles in the family Pythidae. There are about nine described species in Pytho.

Species
 Pytho abieticola Sahlberg, 1875
 Pytho americanus Kirby, 1837
 Pytho depressus Linnaeus, 1767
 Pytho kolwensis Sahlberg, 1833
 Pytho niger Kirby, 1837
 Pytho nivalis Lewis, 1888
 Pytho planus Olivier, 1795
 Pytho seidlitzi Blair, 1925
 Pytho strictus LeConte, 1866

References

Further reading

 
 
 
 
 
 
 

Tenebrionoidea